Magadan is a port town and the administrative center of Magadan Oblast, Russia, located on the Sea of Okhotsk in Nagayev Bay (within Taui Bay) and serving as a gateway to the Kolyma region.

History
Magadan was founded in 1930 in the Ola (river) valley, near the settlement of Nagayevo. During the Stalin era, Magadan was a major transit center for political prisoners sent to forced labour camps. From 1932 to 1953, it was the administrative centre of the Dalstroy organisation—a vast forced-labour gold-mining operation and forced-labour camp system. The first director of Dalstroy was Eduard Berzin, who between 1932 and 1937 established the infrastructure of the forced labour camps in Magadan. Berzin was executed in 1938 by Stalin, towards the end of the Great Purge. 

The town later served as a port for exporting gold and other metals mined in the Kolyma region. Its size and population grew quickly as facilities were rapidly developed for the expanding mining activities in the area. Town status was granted to it on July 14, 1939.

Magadan was visited by U.S. Vice President Henry Wallace in May 1944. He took an instant liking to his NKVD host, admired handiwork done by the enslaved political prisoners, and later glowingly called the town a combination of Tennessee Valley Authority and Hudson's Bay Company. Wallace's collaborative stance towards the Soviet Union discouraged the Democratic Party of the United States from renominating him as vice president later in the summer of 1944, helping lead to the selection of Harry Truman in his place.

Administrative and municipal status
Magadan is the administrative center of the oblast. Within the framework of administrative divisions, it is, together with the urban-type settlements of Sokol and Uptar, incorporated as the "town of oblast significance of Magadan"—an administrative unit with the status equal to that of the districts. As a municipal division, the town of oblast significance of Magadan is incorporated as Magadan Urban Okrug.

Economy and infrastructure

Transport

The Port of Magadan is the second largest seaport in the North-East of Russia after Petropavlovsk-Kamchatsky located on Nagaev Bay and Sea of Okhotsk. It operates all year round with the help of icebreakers. There is currently no operating railway in Magadan. However, the Magadan-Palatka line was operational between 1941 and 1956. Russian Railways are considering the possibility of building a railway from the Nizhny Bestyakh of the Amur-Yakutsk railway to Magadan by 2035, which will contribute to the development of an area with huge mineral deposits. Magadan is the final destination of the federal highway R504 Kolyma Highway, which connects the region with Yakutia and other parts of Russia. Anadyr Highway, currently under construction, will provide access to Chukotka Autonomous Okrug. Sokol Airport and Magadan-13 airport provide access to air transport for numerous destinations in Russia. The former is for big aircraft and the latter is mainly for small aircraft.

Magadan is also the home of the Magadan/Sokol Flight Information Region (FIR) and Magadan Oceanic FIR, which controls the Northeastern part of the Russia and its Arctic airspace. Most of the westbound transpacific flights from North America to Asia will use those FIRs.

Economy 
The principal sources of income for the local economy are gold mining and fisheries. Recently, gold production has declined. Fishing production, although improving from year to year, is still well below the allocated quotas, apparently as a result of an aging fleet. Other local industries include pasta and sausage plants, and a distillery. Although farming is difficult owing to the harsh climate, there are many public and private farming enterprises.

Culture and religion

Culture

It has a number of cultural institutions, including the Regional Museum of Anthropology, a geological museum, a regional library and a university. Magadanskaya Pravda is the main newspaper. 

The town figures prominently in the gulag literature of Varlam Shalamov and in the eponymous song by Mikhail Krug. Actor of film and stage Georgiy Zhzhonov worked at Magadan Theatre for two years after being released from a gulag in May 1945.

Magadan was home to  a famous Soviet and Russian rock group founded there in 1986. 

The town was a focal point of the Long Way Round TV series of a motorcycle journey made by Ewan McGregor, Charley Boorman and their team in 2004.

Religion

The town has the new Orthodox Cathedral Church of the Trinity, Roman Catholic Church of the Nativity (completed in 2002
)

Memorials

The Mask of Sorrow memorial, a large sculpture in memory of Stalin's victims, designed by Ernst Neizvestny. The Church of the Nativity ministers to survivors of the labor camps. It is staffed by several priests and nuns.

Sport

Geography 
The Magadanka river, a 192km long river flowing to the Sea of Okhotsk passes the city. The city is located on Staritsky Peninsula
on Gertner Bay and Nagaev Bay

Ecologically situated in the Northeast Siberian taiga, the town's arboreal flora is made up of conifer trees, such as firs and larches, and silver birches. The city sits besides the Sea of Okhotsk in Nagayev Bay on both sides, and it is surrounded by mountains to the west and northeast. Permafrost and tundra cover most of the region. The growing season is only one hundred days long.

The city of Magadan is on the same longitude as the suburbs of Greater Western Sydney, Australia, which lie on the eastern end of the 150th meridian east line, bordering the 151st meridian and is on the same latitude as Southern Scandinavia, and the far north of Scotland.

Climate 

The climate of Magadan is subarctic (Köppen climate classification Dfc). Winters are prolonged and very cold, with up to six months of sub-zero high temperatures, so that the soil remains permanently frozen. Due to the wet nature of October and November, a snow pack is built up early, which then lasts throughout the winter even while the influence from the Siberian High lowers precipitation throughout those months.

Highest temperature:  on July 15, 2021
Lowest temperature:  on December 20, 1995
Warmest month:  in July, 2009
Coldest month:  in January, 1933
Warmest year:  in 2017
Coldest year:  in 1967
Highest daily Precipitation:  in July, 2014
Wettest month:  in July, 2014
Wettest year:  in 1950
Driest year:  in 1947

Education
 North-Eastern State University (СВГУ, formerly Northern International University)

Notable people
Anton Belyaev (b. 1979), musician, lead singer of Therr Maitz
Anya Garnis (b. 1982), professional dancer, raised in Magadan, but not born there.
Nikolai Getman (1917–2004), artist
Dimitry Ipatov (b. 1984), ski jumper
Inna Korobkina (b. 1981), actress
Vadim Kozin (1903–1994), tenor
Nina Lugovskaya (1918–1993), artist
Sasha Luss (b. 1992), fashion model
Viktor Rybakov (b. 1956), former European amateur boxing champion
Pavel Vinogradov (b. 1953), cosmonaut
Yelena Vyalbe (b. 1968), Olympic cross-country skier

Twin towns and sister cities

Magadan is twinned with:
 Anchorage, United States (1991)
 Tonghua, Jilin, China (1992)
 Jelgava, Latvia (2006)
 Zlatitsa, Bulgaria (2012)
 Shuangyashan, China (2013)

References

Notes

Sources

Ryszard Kapuscinski, Imperium, Granta, 2019, 
McGregor, E & Boorman, C: Long Way Round. Time Warner Books, 2004. 
David J. Nordlander: Origins of a Gulag Capital: Magadan and Stalinist Control in the Early 1930s, Slavic Review, Vol. 57, No. 4 (Winter, 1998), pp. 791–812

External links

Б. П. Важенин (B. P. Vazhenin). "Магадан: к историческим истокам названия" (Magadan: The Historical Sources of Its Name). Российская академия наук, Дальневосточное отделение. Магадан, 2003.
Map of Magadan 
The road up to the Kolyma river. Documentary: repressed in Magadan recall. To watch video.

 
Cities and towns in Magadan Oblast
Port cities and towns in Russia
Populated coastal places in Russia
Sea of Okhotsk
Russian Far East
Russian and Soviet Navy bases
Cities and towns built in the Soviet Union
Populated places established in 1929
1929 establishments in Russia
1929 establishments in the Soviet Union